This article contains an overview of the sport of athletics, including track and field, cross country and road running, in the year 2007.

Major events

World

World Championships in Athletics
World Athletics Final
World Cross Country Championships
World Road Running Championships
World Youth Championships
World Student Games
Military World Games
Golden League
World Marathon Majors

Regional

All-Africa Games
African Junior Championships
Asian Championships
Asian Cross Country Championships
Asian Indoor Games
Pan Arab Games
Southeast Asian Games
NACAC Athletics Championships
NACAC Cross Country Championships
Pan American Games
South American Athletics Championships
South American Cross Country Championships
European Cross Country Championships
European Cup
European Indoor Championships
European Junior Championships
European U23 Championships
European Youth Olympic Festival
European Mountain Running Championships

World records

Men

Women

Notes

Awards

Men

Women

Men's Best Year Performers

100 metres

200 metres

400 metres

800 metres

1500 metres

3000 metres

5000 metres

10000 metres

110 metres hurdles

400 metres hurdles

3000 metres steeplechase

Half Marathon

Marathon

High Jump

Pole Vault

Long Jump

Triple Jump

Shot put

Javelin Throw

Discus Throw

Hammer Throw

Decathlon

Women's Best Year Performers

100 metres

200 metres

400 metres

800 metres

1,500 metres

Mile

Half Marathon

Marathon

100m Hurdles

400m Hurdles

3,000m Steeplechase

High Jump

Pole Vault

Hammer Throw

Heptathlon

Deaths
January 21 — Maria Cioncan (29), Romanian runner (b. 1977)
January 27 — Yang Chuan-kwang (73), Taiwanese decathlete (b. 1933)
January 27 — Yelena Romanova (43), Russian runner (b. 1963)
 April 2 — Satymkul Dzhumanazarov (56), Kyrgyzstani long-distance runner (b. 1951)
August 1 — Veikko Karvonen (81), Finnish long-distance runner (b. 1926)
September 29 — Gyula Zsivótzky (70), Hungarian hammer thrower (b. 1937)
October 1 — Al Oerter (71), American discus thrower (b. 1936)
November 3 — Ryan Shay (28), American long-distances runner (b. 1979)
November 13 — Robert Taylor (59), American sprinter (b. 1948)
November 26 — Herb McKenley (85), Jamaican sprinter (b. 1922)

References
 Year Lists

 
Athletics (track and field) by year